Alperin is a Jewish surname. Notable people with the surname include:

 J. L. Alperin (born 1937), American mathematician, co-discoverer of the Alperin–Brauer–Gorenstein theorem
 Mikhail Alperin (1956–2018), Ukrainian jazz musician
 Steve Alperin, American television news producer

References 

Jewish surnames
Yiddish-language surnames